Autoroute 573 is a short spur road located in Québec City, Quebec, connecting Autoroutes 73 and 40 to Route 369. It facilitates access to the CFB Valcartier military base.

The portion north of Avenue Industrielle is a two-lane super two-style road with signalized intersections.

Exit list

References

External links

Transport Quebec website
Transports Quebec Map 
A-573 at Quebec Autoroutes

73-5
Streets in Quebec City